The 2002 mail2web.com Grand Prix of Mosport was a sports car racing event held at Mosport International Raceway near Bowmanville, Ontario, Canada from August 16 to the 18, 2002. The race was the seventh round of the 2002 American Le Mans Series season, and was the 17th IMSA sanctioned sports car race held at the facility.

Race
The overall race was won by Audi Sport North America's Audi R8 driven by Tom Kristensen and Rinaldo Capello for their third win of the season. Johnny Herbert and Stefan Johansson brought the Champion Racing Audi R8 home for second, while Max Angelelli and JJ Lehto produced Team Cadillac's first podium since 2001 in the Cadillac Northstar LMP02.

The LMP 675 class was won by Team Bucknum Racing's Pilbeam MP84 driven by Jeff Bucknum, Chris McMurry and Bryan Willman. Ontario native and Mosport veteran Ron Fellows along with Corvette Racing teammate Johnny O'Connell drove the Chevrolet Corvette C5-R to victory in the GTS class. The Racer's Group Porsche 911 GT3-RS driven by Kevin Buckler and Brian Cunningham took the GT class win.

The race attracted a crowd of 30,000 and was broadcast on NBC Sports with Rick Benjamin and Bill Adam calling the race.

Official results
Class winners in bold.

Statistics
 Pole Position - #1 Audi Sport North America - 1:07.169
 Fastest Lap - #2 Audi Sport North America - 1:09.568
 Distance - 478.843 km
 Average Speed - 173.898 km/h

Photo Gallery

References

 
 World Sports Racing Prototypes - Race Results

External links
 2002 Grand Prix of Mosport Race Broadcast (American Le Mans Series YouTube Channel)

Mosport
Grand Prix of Mosport
Grand Prix of Mosport
2002 in Ontario